Bialy, originally from the city of Białystok in Poland, is a traditional bread roll in Polish Ashkenazi Jewish cuisine.

Overview

Unlike a bagel, which is boiled before baking, a bialy is simply baked, and instead of a hole in the middle it has a depression. It is also usually covered with onion flakes. Before baking, the depression is sometimes filled with diced onion and other ingredients, sometimes including garlic, poppy seeds, or bread crumbs.

Variations
The bialy was brought to the United States by Polish Jewish immigrants in the late 1800s, and became a staple of Jewish bakeries in the Northeastern United States. Bialys became a popular breakfast bread in New York City and its suburbs, especially among American Jews. Bialys are often made by bagel bakeries, but the bialy has failed to reach mainstream popularity. Preparing bialys in the traditional manner is time-consuming, so many bakeries now use dough mixers, as is common in bagel making. Bialys are considered an iconic New York City food, and can be difficult to find outside that area, but frozen bialys are sold under a number of brand names, such as Ray’s New York, in supermarkets across the US.

In popular culture 
In 2000, former New York Times food writer Mimi Sheraton wrote a book dedicated to the bialy and its role as a symbol of the Jewish heritage of Białystok, entitled The Bialy Eaters: The Story of a Bread and a Lost World.

See also
 Kossar's Bialys, the oldest bialy bakery in the United States
 Cebularz and pletzel, two similar breads

Notes

References

External links
 Bialy recipe at Jewishfood-list.com

Ashkenazi Jewish cuisine
Ashkenazi Jewish culture in New York City
Ashkenazi Jewish culture in Poland
Cuisine of New York City
Jewish breads
Polish cuisine
Poppy seeds
Yeast breads